The following is a list of notable artists who compose, or have composed, dark ambient music at some point in their careers.

#, A

0010x0010
1476
156
Θ (Theta)
Abruptum
Abu Lahab
Adonxs
AeTopus
Agalloch
Alchemy of the 20th Century
Giulio Aldinucci
Alio Die
Allerseelen
All Hail the Transcending Ghost
Altar of Plagues
Alva Noto
Ambeon
Amber Asylum
Anastasia
Kristian Eidnes Andersen
Martin Stig Andersen
Peter Andersson
Anenzephalia
The Anti-Group
Antimatter
Aphex Twin
Apollon
Arcana
Arditi
Art Zoyd
Ascension of the Watchers
Asche
Asriel
Astral Social Club
Freya Aswynn
Ataraxia
aTelecine
Atrax Morgue
Atrium Carceri
Attrition
Aube
Audra
Austere
Autopsia
Autumn Tears
Daniel Avery
The Axis of Perdition
Nigel Ayers

B

Christoph de Babalon
Angelo Badalamenti
Bad Sector
Kelly Bailey
Aidan Baker
Annie Anxiety Bandez
Barathrum
Blixa Bargeld
Bark Psychosis
Barn Owl
Geoff Barrow
William Basinski
Bass Communion
Bastard Noise
Tyler Bates
Destini Beard
Beatsystem
Bobby Beausoleil
Beequeen
Michael Begg
Beherit
Bell Witch
Belong
John Bergin
Eraldo Bernocchi
Harry Bertoia
Maurizio Bianchi
Big City Orchestra
Billain
Biosphere
Birchville Cat Motel
Richie Birkenhead
Joseph Bishara
Raoul Björkenheim
Black Dice
The Black Dog
Blackhouse
Black Leather Jesus
Black Rain
Black Tape for a Blue Girl
Blam Honey
Blood Axis
Blood Incantation
Bloodyminded
Blut Aus Nord
Der Blutharsch
The Body
The Body Lovers / The Body Haters
Bohren & der Club of Gore
Boris
Ben Lukas Boysen
Brighter Death Now
Eric Brosius
Browning Mummery
Harold Budd
Bull of Heaven
Burial
Burial Chamber Trio
Carter Burwell
Burzum

C

Cabaret Voltaire
Ethel Cain
Marc Canham
Carbon Based Lifeforms
The Caretaker
John Carpenter
Kim Cascone
Stijn Van Cauter
Nick Cave
Celer
A Challenge of Honour
Chandeen
Richard Chartier
Ben Chatwin
Cheerleader 69
Chthonic Force
Cindytalk
Cisfinitum
Cities Last Broadcast
 Clan Balache
 Clark
Climax Golden Twins
Clock DVA
Charlie Clouser
Cocteau Twins
Coil
Faith Coloccia
Continuum
Controlled Bleeding
Controlled Death
Coph Nia
Corrupted
Alessandro Cortini
Council of Nine
Clayton Counts
Cousin Silas
Covenant
CTI
Cultus Sabbati
Current 93
Cyclobe

D

Dälek
Dargaard
Dark Sanctuary
Darkspace
David Darling
Sarah Davachi
Dead Can Dance
Dead Voices on Air
Death Ambient
Death Cube K
Death in June
Deathprod
Decree
Delerium
Deleyaman
Demdike Stare
Gitane DeMone
Dernière Volonté
Desiderii Marginis
Deutsch Nepal
Disasterpeace
Disembowelment
Displacer
Djam Karet
Dolorian
Donis
Dragged into Sunlight
dreamSTATE
Kevin Drumm
John Duncan

E

 Earth
Einstürzende Neubauten
Eleh
Elend
Matt Elliott
Warren Ellis
Eluvium
Alec Empire
Endura
Lawrence English
Enigma
Brian Eno
Equimanthorn
Tommie Eriksson
Esoteric
Evoken
Experimental Audio Research (E.A.R.)
Expo '70
Yamantaka Eye

F

Faith and the Muse
Falling You
Florian-Ayala Fauna
Joel Fausto
Jeffrey Fayman
Cedrik Fermont
Dominick Fernow
Fever Ray
Final
Robin Finck
Finite Automata
Fluxion
Le Forbici di Manitù
Michael W. Ford
Die Form
Robert Fripp
Peter Frohmader
Front Line Assembly
Ben Frost
Jun Fukamachi
The Future Sound of London

G

Runhild Gammelsæter
Roopam Garg
Gas
Gazelle Twin
GéNIA
The Gerogerigegege
Lisa Gerrard
Scott Gibbons
Bruce Gilbert
Gnaw Their Tongues
Godspeed You! Black Emperor
Mick Gordon
Mathias Grassow
Gravehill Paris Witch
Graveland
Jason Graves
Martin Grech
Michael Gregor
Randy Greif
Jeff Greinke
Hildur Guðnadóttir

H

The Hafler Trio
Haiku Funeral
Halo Manash
James Hannigan
Kurt Harland
Mick Harris
Paul Haslinger
Hate Forest
Andrea Haugen
John Haughm
Anna von Hausswolff
Carl Michael von Hausswolff
Have a Nice Life
The Haxan Cloak
Hazard
Simon Heath
Hecate
Tim Hecker
Christoph Heemann
Heimkveld Kunst
Sven Helbig
Hell
Hieronymus Bosch
Higher Intelligence Agency
Vladimír Hirsch
Aubrey Hodges
Nicolas Horvath
House of Low Culture
How to Destroy Angels
Dean Hurley
Hwyl Nofio

I, J

ICE
Ice Ages
Das Ich
If, Bwana
Ildjarn
In Death It Ends
Tetsu Inoue
In Slaughter Natives
In the Nursery
Rafael Anton Irisarri
Mark Isham
Jacaszek
David Jackman
Jarboe
Jesu
JK Flesh
Job Karma
Jóhann Jóhannsson
Maurice de Jong
Juno Reactor
GX Jupitter-Larsen

K

Caroline K
Edward Ka-Spel
Yuki Kajiura
Kammarheit
Karjalan Sissit
Khanate
Khlyst
The Kilimanjaro Darkjazz Ensemble
Jacob Kirkegaard
Romke Kleefstra
Klein
Klinik
The Knife
Knurl
Thomas Köner
Konstruktivits
Hermann Kopp
Mark Korven
Bettina Köster
kREEPA
Kreng
Kreuzweg Ost
David Kristian
Kroda
KTL
Jesper Kyd

L

Labradford
Lab Report
Laibach
Alan Lamb
Bill Laswell
Leæther Strip
Richard Lederer
Thomas Leer
The Legendary Pink Dots
Les Légions Noires
Leviathan
Lifelover
Lightwave
Andrew Liles
Lilith
Lingua Ignota
Locrian
Locust
Francisco López
Lord Wind
Lorn
Loscil
Lotus Eaters
Lull
Lunar Womb
Tor Lundvall
Lustmord
Lustre
Lycia
David Lynch

M

m2 (Squaremeter)
Machinefabriek
Maeror Tri
Main
Mama Baer
Mamiffer
Manetheren
Maniac
Clint Mansell
Lasse Marhaug
Cliff Martinez
Bear McCreary
Drew McDowall
Melvins
Daniel Menche
Mentallo and the Fixer
Merzbow
Mesektet
MGR
Midnight Syndicate
Militia Christi
Mistigo Varggoth Darkestra
Moby
Mogwai
The Moon Lay Hidden beneath a Cloud
Steve Moore
Mike Morasky
Mark Morgan
Morgenstern
Morthound
Mortiis
Moss
The Mount Fuji Doomjazz Corporation
Moz
Murcof
John Murphy
Muslimgauze
Mz.412

N

Nadja
Naked City
Pete Namlook
Narqath
Nattramn
Nebulon
Necromantia
Necrophorus
Negură Bunget
Neptune Towers
Loren Nerell
Nest
Phill Niblock
Nightmare Lodge
B. J. Nilsen
Nine Inch Nails
Nocturnal Emissions
Noisegate
NON
Nordvargr
Nortt
Not Your Average Hippy
Nox Arcana
K.K. Null
Nurse with Wound

O

Stephen O'Malley
Of the Wand & the Moon
ohGr
Pauline Oliveros
Ombient
Oneiroid Psychosis
Oneohtrix Point Never
Oniric
oOoOO
Oöphoi
Oranssi Pazuzu
Ordo Equilibrio
Ordo Equitum Solis
Orphx
Cezary Ostrowski
Otto Dix
O Yuki Conjugate

P, Q

Genesis P-Orridge
Painkiller
Charlemagne Palestine
The Panacea
Pan American
Balázs Pándi
Pantha du Prince
Karin Park
Parzival
Paysage d'Hiver
PBK
Daniel Pemberton
Carlos Perón
Sandro Perri
PGR
Pharmakon
Phonothek
Pimentola
James Plotkin
Popol Vuh
Portal
Post Scriptvm
Premature Ejaculation
Steven Price
Primitve Man
Profane Grace
Psychick Warriors ov Gaia
Psychic TV
Puce Mary
Puissance
PureH
Fatima Al Qadiri

R

Éliane Radigue
Radio Werewolf
Raison d'être
Richard Ramirez
Rapoon
Redshift
Reformed Faction
Brian Reitzell
The Residents
The Resonance Association
Graeme Revell
Trent Reznor
Rhythm & Noise
Robert Rich
John Richards
Bill Rieflin
Robin Rimbaud
Tapani Rinne
Steve Roach
Steve Roden
Rome
Yuval Ron
Sam Rosenthal
Rosetta
Atticus Ross
Anthony Rother
Rude 66
Ruptured World
Paul Ruskay

S

Sabled Sun
Gjøran Sæther
Ryuichi Sakamoto
Salem
Ben Salisbury
Sällskapet
Karl Sanders
Satyricon
Janek Schaefer
Conrad Schnitzler
Zeena Schreck
Matthew Schultz
Klaus Schulze
Paul Schütze
Scorn
Tony Scott
Seefeel
Seirom
Sema
Angela Seo
Steven Severin
Shackleton
Shape of Despair
Shinjuku Thief
Howard Shore
The Sight Below
Sigillum S
Sigur Rós
Silencaeon
Sixth Comm
Richard Skelton
Skepticism
Skinny Puppy (briefly in 1984)
Skrika
Sleep Chamber
SleepResearch_Facility
Sleep Token
Mark Snow
Soap&Skin
Socìetas Raffaello Sanzio
Socionic
Soiled
Solar Fields
Soma
Sophia
SpaceGhostPurrp
Specimens
Spektr
SPK 
Alan Splet
Stalnoy Pakt
Steven Stapleton
Stars of the Lid
Michael Stearns
Michael Stein & Kyle Dixon
Colin Stetson
Storm Corrosion
Stratvm Terror
Striborg
Summoning
Sunn O)))
Swans
David Sylvian
Synæsthesia

T

Craig Taborn
Tangerine Dream
Mikko Tarmia
Tear Ceremony
The Tear Garden
Teargas & Plateglass
Techno Animal
Teeth of Lions Rule the Divine
Tenhi
Test Dept
François Tétaz
Terre Thaemlitz
Thighpaulsandra
The Third Eye Foundation
Robert Scott Thompson
Thou
Thou Shalt Suffer
Throbbing Gristle
David Thrussell
David Tibet
Asmus Tietchens
TISM (briefly in the 1980s)
Amon Tobin
Toroidh
Devin Townsend
Jill Tracy
Trance to the Sun
Trepaneringsritualen
Triangular Ascension
Tribes of Neurot
Troum
Trust Obey
Tuu
Twice a Man

U, V

Uboa
Mirko Uhlig
Ulver
Unto Ashes
V/Vm
Mika Vainio
Mike VanPortfleet
Christina Vantzou
Velvet Cacoon
Die Verbannten Kinder Evas
Darrin Verhagen
Vidna Obmana
Franck Vigroux
Vindensång
Violence
VNV Nation
Voice of Eye
Vromb

W

Kanon Wakeshima
Scott Walker
Wapstan
Wardruna
Warning Light
Norman Westberg
Westwind
Whitehouse
White Ring
Guy Whitmore
Klaus Wiese
Simon Wilkinson
Will
Steven Wilson
Windy & Carl
A Winged Victory for the Sullen
Witchman
Chelsea Wolfe
Wolves in the Throne Room
Wongraven
Woob
Worriedaboutsatan
Wrekmeister Harmonies
Wumpscut

X - Z

Xasthur
Xiu Xiu
X Marks the Pedwalk
Akira Yamaoka
Year of No Light
Yellow Swans
Christopher Young
David Yow
Luca Yupanqui
Z'EV
Za Frûmi
Eric Zann
John Zewizz
Adrian von Ziegler
Hans Zimmer
Zoar
Zonal
John Zorn
Zos Kia
Zoviet France

References

Dark ambient
Dark ambient
Dark ambient musicians